David Mazzoncini (born 16 October 1971) is a French former professional footballer who played as a defender and midfielder.

Career
Born in Bertrange, Mazzoncini played for Martigues, Le Havre, Cannes, Bastia, Changchun Yatai, Shenzhen, Las Palmas, Al-Sailiya, Orléans and Saint-Pryvé Saint-Hilaire.

He was critical of football in Qatar, describing players as being like "puppets" for the club's owners.

He retired from football in 2011, with a "jubilee" match being played in his honour.

During the 2022 FIFA World Cup. he was employed as the Logistics Manager for the France national football team in Doha.

References

1971 births
Living people
Association football defenders
Association football midfielders
French footballers
FC Martigues players
Le Havre AC players
AS Cannes players
SC Bastia players
Changchun Yatai F.C. players
Shenzhen F.C. players
UD Las Palmas players
Al-Sailiya SC players
US Orléans players
Saint-Pryvé Saint-Hilaire FC players
Ligue 2 players
Ligue 1 players
Chinese Super League players
Segunda División players
French expatriate footballers
French expatriate sportspeople in China
Expatriate footballers in China
French expatriate sportspeople in Spain
Expatriate footballers in Spain
French expatriate sportspeople in Qatar
Expatriate footballers in Qatar